NRB is India's largest needle and cylindrical roller bearings producer headquartered in Mumbai. NRB was incorporated in 1965 as an Indo-French venture with Nadella and pioneered the production of needle roller bearings in India. Its eight manufacturing facilities in India and Thailand produce needle roller bearings, cylindrical roller bearings, tapered roller bearings, special ball bearings, thrust bearings and other anti friction solutions such as planetary shafts and pins.

The company set up an engineering and design centre at its manufacturing unit in Thane in 2000. Today the facility has testing, validation and benchmarking capabilities.

References

External links
 http://economictimes.indiatimes.com/markets/stocks/news/wheels-of-fortune-turn-for-auto-put-nrb-bearings-in-pole-position/articleshow/53495923.cms
 http://www.motorindiaonline.in/component/nrb-bearings-creating-value-with-innovative-design-technology/
 http://btmostpowerfulwomen.com/2014/harshbeena_zaveri.html
 http://www.rediff.com/business/slide-show/slide-show-1-indias-most-powerful-women-in-business/20111110.htm#15
 http://economictimes.indiatimes.com/news/company/corporate-trends/lady-with-the-right-bearings/articleshow/2458833.cms
 http://www.naaree.com/interview-indian-woman-entrepreneur-harshbeena-sahney-zaveri/
 http://www.livemint.com/Companies/jgoGCr023u6NRywaPydymM/Making-a-dent-in-a-male-bastion.html
 http://womnz.com/the-women-who-inspire-us/
 http://expressindia.indianexpress.com/karnatakapoll08/story_page.php?id=873399
 https://www.thedollarbusiness.com/news/precision-driven/43174
 https://www.vccircle.com/nalanda-capital-buys-around-8-stake-auto-ancillary-firm-nrb-bearings/
 http://www.indiantelevision.com/release/y2k13/jun/junrel15.php
 http://rakesh-jhunjhunwala.in/nrb-bearings-is-undervalued-has-strong-upside-buy-now-for-28-gain-crisil/
 https://www.crisil.com/Ratings/Brochureware/News/CRISIL-Research_PR_IER_NRB%20Bearings_02Jan2014.pdf

Bearing manufacturers
Manufacturing companies established in 1965
Manufacturing companies based in Mumbai
Indian brands
1965 establishments in Maharashtra
Indian companies established in 1965
Companies listed on the Bombay Stock Exchange